Gurudwara Paonta Sahib, is a noted Gurudwara in Paonta Sahib, District of Sirmaur, Himachal Pradesh. 

This Gurdwara was built in memory  of Guru Gobind Singh ji, the tenth guru of sikhs. The Gurdwara enjoys a high historic and religious importance among the followers of the Sikh religion world over. The Gurudwara have a palanquin "Palki" made of pure gold, donated by devotees.

Shri Talab Asthan and Shri Dastar Asthan are the vital places inside the Sikh shrine. Shri Talab Asthan is used for disbursing salaries and Shri Dastar Asthan is used for organizing the turban tying competitions. A legendary temple is also attached to the Gurudwara which is rebuilt recently in the vicinity of Gurudwara compound. Kavi Darbar, a prominent place near the Gurudwara is the venue for holding the poetry competitions. The weapons and pens used by  Guru Gobind Singh Ji are displayed in a museum near the Paonta Sahib Gurudwara.
The Gurudwara is visited by tourists from different states. The site is situated on the bank of River Yamuna. This gurudwara serves langar (parshada)for all. The pure beauty of gurudwara signifies that God is one and we all are its children.

Another place of religious and historical importance is the Gurdwara built at Bhangani Sahib, about 1 km from Gurdwara Tir Garhi Sahib. With its proximity to the river Yamuna, the whole area presents a picturesque sight.

References

External links
 Official website 
 Other website

Gurdwaras in Himachal Pradesh
Buildings and structures in Sirmaur district